The untitled eighth studio album by American nu metal band Korn was released on July 31, 2007, by Virgin Records. It is the band's only studio release without an official drummer, released between the departure of David Silveria in 2006 and the arrival of Ray Luzier in late 2007. Vocalist Jonathan Davis hired drummers Terry Bozzio and Brooks Wackerman as session musicians. The album was intentionally released without a title, as Davis reasoned, "Why not just let our fans call it whatever they wanna call it?" The album was certified Gold in the United States on October 30, 2007.

Background information
This album was the first without former drummer David Silveria, instead, Korn enlisted the help of Terry Bozzio, Brooks Wackerman, as well as Jonathan Davis for drumming. Also, the band recruited Zac Baird as keyboardist on this album. An MTV article published on May 17, 2007, includes an interview with Munky as he details the process of the new studio album, while also revealing several song titles. On May 28, vocalist Jonathan Davis joined Dutch radio station 3FM immediately after his performance at the Pinkpop Festival. He commented on the band's upcoming album, stating it "will not be titled." He elaborated, "We had the world's greatest drummer Terry Bozzio in and Brooks Wackerman from Bad Religion in and I played drums on some songs too. I'm so proud of it, we just can't wait to show people what we've done." Davis went on to say "We didn't want to label this album. It has no boundaries. It has no limits and why not just let our fans call it whatever they wanna call it?"

Terry Bozzio's contributions
After successfully recording six tracks with Bozzio, Zac Baird announced that Bozzio would not be touring with the band on the Family Values Tour 2007. Jonathan Davis claims "things just got weird [with Bozzio]." Brooks Wackerman of Bad Religion was brought in to record some tracks, and even Jonathan Davis himself contributed, something not done since 1999's Issues. Munky stated in an interview that Bozzio had imposed himself on the band. He mentioned that among other things, Bozzio had demanded to be a full member of the band while receiving 25% interest; the band felt that this was "offensive", therefore, Korn decided not to tour with Bozzio. Joey Jordison of Slipknot would tour with Korn on the Family Values Tour, along with the Bitch We Have a Problem Tour.

The Matrix's departure
When premiering the single "Evolution" on KROQ on May 16, 2007, guitarist Munky noted that the band re-recorded much of the Matrix's tracks with Atticus Ross because of the band being dissatisfied with how the material had turned out. This was later confirmed in a Reuters/Billboard article:

Release
The album was released through EMI/Virgin in various territories, starting on July 27, 2007. The band ventured on the trio's Family Values Tour 2007 several days prior to the release and toured in support of the new record. The deluxe edition contains the bonus track "Sing Sorrow" (which follows the thirteenth track, "I Will Protect You"), a bonus DVD containing behind-the-scenes footage, hundreds of never-before seen photos of the band. The album debuted at number 2 on the Billboard 200, the highest since Untouchables. The untitled album sold 123,000 copies in its first week. It also fell off the charts within twelve weeks, accumulating twenty weeks altogether. In the United States, this is the most recent Korn album to receive any sort of certification from the RIAA.

 July 27, 2007 – Germany
 July 30, 2007 – United Kingdom, Mexico
 July 31, 2007 – United States, Canada
 August 8, 2007 – Japan
 October 14, 2007 – Vietnam, Philippines, Singapore
 December 18, 2007 – United Arab Emirates

Critical reception

Reception was mostly met with a mixed response from critics. Metacritic registered an aggregate score of 51 out of 100. The most positive reviews coming from IGN, The Gauntlet, and Billboard. IGN noted that, "There's an overall cohesion from start to finish, and repeated listens continue to reveal new and intriguing elements at every turn, which bodes well for the future", while The Gauntlet wrote, " 'Untitled' is the most articulate recording the band has delivered to date." Entertainment Weekly also praised the album as being the band's best release "since 1999's 'Issues'".

On the contrary, AllMusic critic Stephen Thomas Erlewine noted that the band is going through a "middle-age slump" and that the album "doesn't break them out of it." Rolling Stone asserted that Korn sounds "wounded and diminished", while PopMatters agreed, calling it "tired, bland and dated... merely going through the motions rather than creating honest music."

Track listing

Deluxe edition bonus DVD
 Making-of documentary
 Korn photo slideshow

Personnel

Korn
 Jonathan Davis – vocals; bagpipes, drums on "Bitch We Got a Problem" and "Love and Luxury", additional drums on "Kiss" and "Hushabye"
 James "Munky" Shaffer – guitar; lap steel guitar
 Reginald "Fieldy" Arvizu – bass

Additional musicians
 Terry Bozzio – drums on "Intro", "Starting Over", "Kiss", "Do What They Say", "Ever Be", "Killing", "I Will Protect You", and "Sing Sorrow"
 Brooks Wackerman – drums on "Evolution", "Hold On", "Innocent Bystander", and "Hushabye"
 Zac Baird – keyboards, organ, synthesizer

Mixing
 Terry Date – mixing on "Evolution", "Do What They Say", "Innocent Bystander", and "I Will Protect You"
 Alan Moulder – mixing on "Starting Over", "Hold On", "Kiss", "Ever Be", and "Love and Luxury"

A&R
 Peter Katsis – A&R
 James Bryant – A&R, A&R coordination, art consultation

Technical personnel
 Atticus Ross – producer, mixing on "Intro" and "Bitch We Got a Problem"
 Korn and The Matrix (Lauren Christy, Graham Edwards, Scott Spock) – production
 Jim "Bud" Monti and Frank Filipetti – recording, engineering
 Doug Trantow – additional engineering, mixing on "Intro" and "Bitch We Got a Problem"
 Stephen Marcussen – mastering for Marcussen Mastering, Hollywood, CA
 Stewart Whitmore – digital editing
 Leopold Ross – production assistant
 Jeff Kwatinetz – executive producer, exclusive management for The Firm
 Jeff Katsis – exclusive management for The Firm
 John Branca, Gary Stiffelman and David Byrnes – legal representation for Ziffren, Brittenham, Branca, Fischer, Gilbert-Lurie, Stiffelman and Cook, LLP
 Larry Einbund and Bill Vuylsteke – business management for Provident Financial Management
 Darryl Eaton and Rick Roskin – booking agents for Creative Artists Agency
 Nikki Hirsch – product management
 Sean Mosher-Smith – art direction and design
 Richard Kirk – artwork
 Chapman Baehler – photography

Charts and certifications

Album

Certifications

Singles

References

2007 albums
Albums produced by Atticus Ross
EMI Records albums
Korn albums
Virgin Records albums